Like Crazy is a 2011 American film.

Like Crazy may also refer to:

 Like Crazy (2016 film), Italian film
 Like Crazy, album by Rose Falcon 2013
 "Like Crazy", song and single by Korean band 2AM from album Saint o'Clock 2010

See also: